Jackpot is the debut studio album by American rapper Chingy. Sales of the album achieved Double Platinum in the US. It was released on July 15, 2003, by Capitol Records, The Trak Starz's Trak Starz imprint, and Ludacris's Disturbing Tha Peace. Anchored by the smash single "Right Thurr", this album also had two other hits, "Holidae In" featuring Ludacris and Snoop Dogg, and "One Call Away" featuring J-Weav. The album was produced by the Trak Starz except for "Bagg Up", which was produced by Da Quiksta. The enhanced version of the album features the uncut video of "Right Thurr".

Critical reception

Jackpot received generally mixed reviews from music critics who drew comparisons to fellow St. Louis rapper Nelly. Roni Sarig of Rolling Stone praised the record for its mixture of different U.S. regions from hip-hop, concluding with, "Taken all together, Jackpot is short on depth, but it's a ride with some hitworthy moments and plenty of bounce." Steve 'Flash' Juon of RapReviews was mixed about the album, being ambivalent towards the Trak Starz's production and Chingy's skills as a rapper, saying "As a summer album, Chingy's "Jackpot" is a take it or leave it affair. It's relatively inoffensive, and certainly has some songs you'd want to play at a party, club or while driving around." Dorian Lynskey of The Guardian also saw the album's tropes and Chingy's use of Nelly's style.

Jason Birchmeier of AllMusic was also mixed towards the record, finding the hooks on the tracks not being on par with the beats and Chingy himself lacking substance in his rhymes. Joe Caramanica of Entertainment Weekly felt that Chingy paled in comparison to Nelly, despite having the same vocal tic as him, saying he has "only one gimmick, and while it charms on "Sample Dat Ass" and "One Call Away," most of Jackpot is as ephemeral as the winds blowing through the Arch." Robert Christgau cited "Chingy Jackpot" as a "choice cut", indicating a good song on "an album that isn't worth your time or money." Dom Passantino of Stylus Magazine gave a negative review, criticizing the production for having weak beats and found every other track "a failed second single." He also called out other critics' reviews for their so-called criticism of the album.

Billboard magazine ranked Jackpot at number 151 on the magazine's Top 200 Albums of the Decade.

Commercial performance
Jackpot debuted at number two on the US Billboard 200 chart, selling 157,000 copies in its first week. In its second week, the album dropped to number six on the chart. In its third week, the album rose to number five on the chart, selling 77,000 copies. In its fourth week, the album remained at number five on the chart, selling 68,000 copies that week. On February 24, 2004, the album was certified double platinum by the Recording Industry Association of America (RIAA) for sales of over two million copies in the United States. As of August 2004, it had sold 2.8 million copies in the US.

Track listing 

Sample credits
 Bagg Up contains a sample of Curtis Mayfield's Ain't Got Time (1974)

Charts

Weekly charts

Year-end charts

Certifications

References

2003 debut albums
Chingy albums
Capitol Records albums
Disturbing tha Peace albums
Albums produced by Jermaine Dupri
Albums produced by DJ Quik

pt:Jackpot